The 2005 WNBA season was the ninth season for the Houston Comets. The Comets knocked off defending champion Seattle Storm in the first round, but they were unable to get past the eventual champion Sacramento Monarchs in the conference finals.

Offseason

WNBA Draft

Regular season

Season standings

Season schedule

Player stats

References

Houston Comets seasons
Houston
Houston